Barchi can refer to:

Barchi, a city in the province of Pesaro e Urbino (Italy)
Barchi, a type of lance